is a former Japanese football player and manager. He played for Japan national team.

Club career
Nakamura was born in Mizuho, Tokyo on June 10, 1971. He joined Japan Soccer League club Yomiuri (later Verdy Kawasaki) from youth team in 1990. He played as right and left side-back. The club won the champions 1990–91, 1991–92 Japan Soccer League and 1991 JSL Cup. In 1992, Japan Soccer League was folded and founded new league J1 League. The club won the champions J1 League 2 times, J.League Cup 3 times and Emperor's Cup 1 time. He moved to Urawa Reds in 1999 and Kyoto Purple Sanga in 2000. He retired end of 2004 season.

National team career
On February 15, 1995, Nakamura debuted for Japan national team against Australia. He also played at 1998 World Cup qualification in 1997. He played 16 games for Japan until 1998.

Coaching career
After retirement, Nakamura started coaching career at Tokyo Verdy in 2005. He coached for youth team. He moved to FC Tokyo in 2012 and coached for youth team. In July 2017, he became a coach for top team and a manager for FC Tokyo U-23. He resigned in 2017.

Club statistics

National team statistics

Managerial statistics

References

External links
 
 Japan National Football Team Database
 
 

1971 births
Living people
Seikei University alumni
Association football people from Tokyo
Japanese footballers
Japan international footballers
Japan Soccer League players
J1 League players
J2 League players
Tokyo Verdy players
Urawa Red Diamonds players
Kyoto Sanga FC players
Japanese football managers
J3 League managers
FC Tokyo U-23 managers
Association football defenders